Yoon In-sun (born 1958) is a Korean football defender who played for South Korea in the 1980 President's Cup Football Tournament against Bahrain. He also played for Yonsei University.

International record

References

External links

South Korea international footballers
South Korean footballers
1958 births
Living people
Place of birth missing (living people)
Association football defenders
1980 AFC Asian Cup players